Lights Out may refer to:

Events and times
 Institutional, and thence colloquial, term for bedtime
Lights Out (event), an event in the UK on 4 August 2014 to commemorate the start of World War I
 Lights Out Hong Kong, a campaign to protest air pollution
 88888 Lights Out, a program in India to increase awareness of climate change

Technology 
 Lights out (manufacturing), a manufacturing methodology
 Lights-out management or out-of-band management, a technology for network device maintenance
 HP Integrated Lights-Out, a server management technology

People
 Brad Lidge (born 1976), American baseball pitcher
 Chris Lytle (born 1974), American mixed martial arts fighter
 Shawne Merriman (born 1984), American football player
 James Toney (born 1968), American boxer

Film, television, and radio 
 Lights Out (1923 film), a 1923 American silent film
 Lights Out (1953 film), a 1953 Brazilian drama film
 Lights Out (2010 film), a 2010 French film
 Lights Out (2013 film), a 2013 horror short film by David F. Sandberg
 Lights Out (2016 film), an American supernatural horror film
 Lights Out (upcoming film), an upcoming American film
 Lights Out (radio show), a 1930s/1940s American radio program
 Lights Out (1946 TV series), a series based on the radio show
 Lights Out (2011 TV series), an American boxing drama series
 Lights Out with David Spade, an American late-night talk show

Television episodes 

 "Lights Out" (6teen)
 "Lights Out" (American Restoration)
 "Lights Out" (The Bad News Bears)
 "Lights Out" (The Brady Bunch)
 "Lights Out" (Brothers & Sisters)
 "Lights Out" (Camp Lazlo)
 "Lights Out" (Clifford the Big Red Dog)
 "Lights Out" (ER)
 "Lights Out" (Fairly OddParents)
 "Lights Out" (Glee)
 "Lights Out" (Grossology)
 "Lights Out" (Invasion)
 "Lights Out!" (Ozzy & Drix)
 "Lights Out" (Rob Dyrdek's Fantasy Factory)
 "Lights Out" (Still Game)

Games 
 Lights Out (game), a 1995 electronic puzzle
 Dark Fall II: Lights Out, a 2004 computer game
 The Fight: Lights Out, a 2010 action fighting video game

Literature 
 Lights Out (manhwa), a Korean comic
 Lights Out (comics), a 1958 Disney comic by Carl Barks
 Lights Out, a novel by Baynard Kendrick
 Lights Out- Pride, Delusion and the Fall of General Electric, by Thomas Gryta and Ted Mann

Music

Song cycle
 Lights Out, an orchestral song cycle by Ivor Gurney with words by Edward Thomas

Albums 
 Lights Out (Antimatter album), or the title song, 2003
 Lights Out (Ezhel and Ufo361 album), or the title song, 2019
 Lights Out (Graveyard album), 2012
 Lights Out (Ingrid Michaelson album), 2014
 Lights Out (Lil Wayne album), 2000
 Lights Out (Peter Wolf album), or the title song, 1984
 Lights Out (Silverline album), or the title song, 2013
 Lights Out (Sugarcult album), or the title song, 2006
 Lights Out (UFO album), or the title song, 1977
 Lights Out!, by Jackie McLean, 1956
 Lights Out, by Bishop Allen, 2014
 Lights Out, by Nine, 2001
 Lights Out, by Posthum, 2012
 Lights Out, by Steve Lawler, 2002

Songs 
 "Lights Out" (Breaking Benjamin song)
 "Lights Out" (Lisa Marie Presley song)
 "Lights Out" (Rick Astley song)
 "Lights Out" (Royal Blood song)
 "Lights Out" (Santigold song)
 "Lights Out" (Silverline song)
 "Lights Out" (Virginia to Vegas song)
 "Lights Out", by Jerry Byrne
 "Lights Out", by The Angry Samoans from Back from Samoa
 "Lights Out", by Attila from Rage
 "Lights Out", by Car Bomb from Meta
 "Lights Out", by Danity Kane from Welcome to the Dollhouse
 "Lights Out", by Estelle from Lovers Rock
 "Lights Out", by Fabolous from There Is No Competition 2: The Grieving Music EP
 "Lights Out", by Green Day, a B-side from the single "Know Your Enemy"
 "Lights Out", by Hollywood Undead from American Tragedy
 "Lights Out", by classical composer Ivor Gurney
 "Lights Out", by Khleo Thomas
 "Lights Out", by Mack 10 from Ghetto, Gutter & Gangster
 "Lights Out", by The Mighty Mighty Bosstones from Ska-Core, the Devil, and More
 "Lights Out", by Mindless Self Indulgence from If
 "Lights Out", by Owen from I Do Perceive
 "Lights Out", by P.O.D. from Testify
 "Lights Out", by Peter Wolf from Lights Out
 "Lights Out", by Savatage from Edge of Thorns
 "Lights Out", by Sonic Youth from Rather Ripped
 "Lights Out", by We Are the In Crowd from Guaranteed to Disagree

See also
 Earth Hour, a global event to increase awareness of climate change
 Lights Off (disambiguation)
 Lights On (disambiguation)